Thailand is scheduled to compete in the 2017 Asian Winter Games in Sapporo and Obihiro, Japan from February 19 to 26.

Thailand is scheduled to compete in three sports (seven disciplines). The team consisted of 55 athletes, which marks the most the country has sent to the Asian Winter Games.

Competitors
The following table lists the Thai delegation per sport and gender. 

The same athlete will compete in both alpine and freestyle skiing.

Alpine skiing

Thailand competed in the alpine skiing competition with one male athlete. Robert-Worachai Pinsent will also compete in freestyle skiing.

Men

Cross-country skiing

Thailand entered two athletes, however their results did not count at the time for unknown reasons.

Men
 Mark Chanloung

Women
 Karen Chanloung

Figure skating

Thailand entered two female figure skaters in the ladies individual competition.

Individual

Freestyle skiing

Thailand will compete in the freestyle skiing competition with one male athlete. Robert-Worachai Pinsent will also compete in alpine skiing.

Men
 Robert-Worachai Pinsent

Ice hockey

Thailand has entered teams in both hockey tournaments. The men's team will compete in division one. Thailand's men's team finished in first place (5th place overall) in division 1 of the competition.

Men's tournament

Thailand was represented by the following 18 athletes:

Prawes Kaewjeen (G)
Prakpoom Thongaram (G) 
Ungkulpattanasuk Pattarapol (G)
Nattapong Harnnarujchai (D)
Anun Kullugin (D)
Chanchit Supadilokluk (D)
Tanapon Andreas Helgesen (D)
Edvin Ken Kindborn (D)
Papan Thanakroekkiat (D)
Likit Neimwan (D)
Voravith Maklamthong (D)
Rakchai Sukwiboon (F)
Tewin Chartsuwan (F)
Panithi Nawasmittawong (F)
Weerachai Prasertsri (F)
Teerasak Rattanachot (F)
Jantaphong Tengsakul (F)
Juhani Kim Aarola (F)
Chanchieo Supadilokluk (F)
Rattharut Surasirirattanasin (F)
Peravit Kovitaya (F)
Masato Kitayama (F)

Legend
G– Goalie D = Defense F = Forward

Women's tournament

Thailand was represented by the following 20 athletes:

Wasunun Angkulpattanasuk (G)
Wichaya Phangnga (G)
Sirikarn Jittresin (D)
Siriluck Kaewkitinarong (D)
Pimnapa Pungpapong (D)
Nion Putsuk (D)
Jaravee Srichamnong (D)
Varachanant Boonyubol (F)
Kwanchanok Choeiklang (F)
Siriwan Kaewkitinarong (F)
Pawadee Keratichewanun (F)
Nuchanat Ponglerkdee (F)
Kritsana Promdirat (F)
Wirasinee Rattananai (F)
Pijittra Jear Sae (F)
Rungrawee Sakulsurarat (F)
Fongfon Sukontanit (F)
Panvipa Suksirivecharuk (F)
Thanravee Surasirirattanasin (F)
Minsasha Teekhathanasakul (F)

Legend: G = Goalie, D = Defense, F = Forward

Short track speed skating

Thailand's short track speed skating team consisted of three male athletes. 

Men
Teerasak Boonpok
Prakit Bovornmongkolsak
Atip Navarat

Speed skating

Thailand's speed skating team consisted of one female athlete.

Woman

References

Nations at the 2017 Asian Winter Games
Asian Winter Games
Thailand at the Asian Winter Games